Robert da Silva Almeida, best known as Robert (born 3 April 1971 in Salvador), is a Brazilian former professional footballer who played as a midfielder and currently professional football manager.

Career statistics

Club

International

Performances in Major International Tournaments

Honours 
Santos
 Torneio Rio-São Paulo: 1997
 Campeonato Brasileiro Série A: 2002

Grêmio 
 Copa Sul: 1999
 Campeonato Gaúcho: 1998

Atlético Mineiro
 Campeonato Mineiro: 1999

External links

External links

 

1971 births
Sportspeople from Salvador, Bahia
Living people
Association football midfielders
Brazilian footballers
Brazilian football managers
Brazil international footballers
Brazilian expatriate footballers
Expatriate footballers in Japan
Expatriate soccer managers in the United States
Campeonato Brasileiro Série A players
Campeonato Brasileiro Série B players
J2 League players
2001 FIFA Confederations Cup players
Olaria Atlético Clube players
Guarani FC players
Rio Branco Atlético Clube players
Santos FC players
Grêmio Foot-Ball Porto Alegrense players
Clube Atlético Mineiro players
Associação Desportiva São Caetano players
Hokkaido Consadole Sapporo players
Sport Club Corinthians Paulista players
Esporte Clube Bahia players
America Football Club (RJ) players